The Budapest Metro is the rapid transit system in the Hungarian capital Budapest. It is the world's oldest electrified underground railway system, and the second oldest underground railway system with multiple stations, after the originally steam-powered London Underground. Budapest's iconic Line 1 was completed in 1896.

The M1 line became an IEEE Milestone due to the radically new innovations in its era: "Among the railway's innovative elements were bidirectional tram cars; electric lighting in the subway stations and tram cars; and an overhead wire structure instead of a third-rail system for power." Since 2002, the M1 line was listed as a UNESCO World Heritage Site.

History

To clarify where the first "metro" in continental Europe was built, a few distinctions must be made. While the original Metro Line 1 is the oldest electrified underground railway in continental Europe, it is not the oldest underground railway. Outside of the United Kingdom, the oldest fully underground urban railway in the world is the Tünel line in Istanbul, built in 1875. However since Tünel is a funicular railway, it may or may not be considered a "metro" line, in the classic sense. Therefore, depending on one's definition of a metro, the Budapest Metro is either the oldest or 2nd oldest underground urban railway in continental Europe.

The original Metro Line 1 ("Földalatti") ran for 5 km from Vörösmarty tér to Széchenyi fürdő (from Hungarian föld "earth, ground", alatt "under"; so "the underground"). Line M1 was inaugurated on May 2, 1896, the year of the millennium (the thousandth anniversary of the arrival of the Magyars), by emperor Franz Joseph.  It was named "Franz Joseph Underground Electric Railway Company".

Works on Metro Line 2 started in the 1950s, although the first section did not open until 1970. It follows an east–west route, connecting the major Keleti (Eastern) and Déli (Southern) railway stations.

Planning for Metro Line 3 began in 1963 and construction started in 1970 with help of Soviet specialists. The first section, consisting of six stations, opened in 1976. It was extended to the south in 1980 with five additional stations, and to the north in 1981, 1984, and 1990, with nine additional stations.

Construction of the fourth Metro line began in 2004. The line opened after several delays and budget overruns in May 2014.

Routes
The metro consists of four lines (M1–M4), each denoted by a different colour. M1 (yellow) runs from Mexikói út south-west towards the river. The M2 (red) line travels east–west through the city, crossing the Danube. The M3 (blue) runs in a broadly north–south alignment, interchanging with the three other lines. The M4 (green) line commences at Keleti pályaudvar and travels south-west, crossing the river, to terminate at Kelenföld vasútállomás.

Metro line M1

Line 1 runs northeast from the city centre on the Pest side under Andrássy út to the Városliget, or City Park. Like Metro 3, it does not serve Buda. Line 1, the oldest of the metro lines operating in Budapest, has been in constant operation since 1896. In the 1980s and 1990s, the line underwent major reconstruction. Of its 11 stations currently served, eight are original and three were added during the reconstruction. The original appearance of the old stations has been preserved, and each station feature displays of historical photographs and information. As part of the reconstructiona Millennium Underground Museum in the old station at Deák Ferenc tér connected to the concourse. 
There are plans for the future extension of the line in both directions.

Metro line M2
Line 2 runs east–west from Déli pályaudvar in Buda's Krisztinaváros, through the city center, to Örs vezér tere in eastern Pest. It offers connections to Hungarian State Railways at Déli and Keleti pályaudvars, to metro lines M1 and M3 at Deák Ferenc tér, to M4 at Keleti pályaudvar, to suburban railway lines 8 and 9 at Örs vezér tere, and to suburban railway line 5 at Batthyány tér. Prior to the opening of M4, it was (for more than 45 years) the only metro line that served the Buda side of the city.
Metro Line 2 underwent a major reconstruction in the second half of the 2000s, with all of the track replaced and stations revamped by 2010. The entire fleet of Metrovagonmash 81-717/81-714 cars operating on the line were replaced with Alstom Metropolis metro cars by 2012.
Planning of a direct connection of Metro Line 2 and the suburban railway lines with a shared new station at Örs vezér tere and the addition of a potential new underground station near Hungexpo Budapest Congress and Exhibition Center, offering another interchange point to mainline railways began in 2021.

Metro line M3

Line 3  runs in a north–south direction (more exactly, from north-northeast to southeast) on the Pest side of the river and connects several populous residential areas with the Inner City. It has a transfer station with Line 1 and Line 2 at Deák Ferenc tér, and an interchange with Line 4 at Kálvin tér. It is the longest line in the Budapest Metro, its daily ridership is estimated at 610,000. An automatic train drive system was introduced in 1990. A complete renovation of the line started in 2017. The planned upgrades include renewing the stations, rebuilding the track, safety equipment, ventilation and tunnel insulation. Design works are entirely funded by the European Union under the New Széchenyi Plan. The project also includes the renovation of the rolling stock and a possible extension of the metro line to Káposztásmegyer. As of May 2022, 12 of the 20 stations have been inaugurated.

Metro line M4

Line 4 runs southwest–northeast from Kelenföldi pályaudvar in Buda's Kelenföld neighborhood to Keleti Railway Station in Józsefváros. Line 4 was completed in March 2014 and comprises ten stations.

Future expansion

Metro line M5

The Purple Line 5 is a proposed north–south railway tunnel to connect the currently separated elements of the suburban rail network, namely the H5, H6 and H7 HÉV-lines, and optionally the Budapest-Esztergom and Budapest-Kunszentmiklós-Tass railway lines. Currently the project does not have mainstream political support, only included in long-term plans. The first phase (planned until 2030) would be the extension and connection of the southern H6 and H7 lines to the Astoria metro station via the Kálvin tér, thus connecting these lines to the metro lines M2 M3 and M4. The second phase would create a connection to the metro line M1 as well at the Oktogon, the M3 at Lehel tér then cross the Danube to the Buda side to connect the H5 HÉV towards Szentendre.

General information

Tickets and transfer system
The usual BKK tickets and passes can be used on all lines. Single tickets can be re-used when changing metro lines.

There are plans for an automated fare collection system. A contract for a system was signed in 2014, but terminated in 2018 without completion.

In popular culture
The internationally acclaimed 2003 Hungarian thriller Kontroll is set and was filmed in the metro system on the line M3.

A scene in John Huston's 1981 film Escape to Victory features the historic Metro Line 1 as the Paris Métro in the 1940s.

A long fight sequence in the 2003 action film Underworld was filmed in the Budapest Metro.

Nyugati pályaudvar metro station also appears in the 2021 Marvel Cinematic Universe film Black Widow.

The Budapest Metro features heavily in the music video for Holding On For You by Liberty X.

Network map

See also

 List of metro systems
 List of automated urban metro subway systems

Notes

References

External links

 Budapest Metro Map 2016–17 on Google earth with geolocation
 BKK Zrt. – official website
 Budapest Metro Track map
 Budapest at UrbanRail.net
 Budapest Metro Map

   

 
1896 establishments in Hungary
Railway lines opened in 1896
History of Budapest
Underground rapid transit in Hungary
Railway lines in Hungary